Ramon D. Walker (born November 8, 1979) is an American football defensive back who played in the NFL. Walker ranks seventh on the University of Pittsburgh's all-time list with 307 career tackles over just three seasons. He also deflected 14 passes and intercepted two.  He started in all 11 games at free safety in 2001 while earning first-team All-Big East honors. He was drafted in the 2002 NFL Draft by the Houston Texans.

References

1979 births
Living people
American football safeties
Houston Texans players
Pittsburgh Panthers football players
Players of American football from Akron, Ohio